Syracuse, New York, United States, is a top-division, minor-league and college sports city. Teams include the Syracuse Mets of AAA Baseball and the Syracuse Crunch of the AHL. The most attended sporting events in Syracuse are those of the NCAA Division I Syracuse University Orange.

Professional teams

The Syracuse Mets, who play in the International League, are a AAA Minor League Baseball affiliate of the New York Mets.

The Syracuse Crunch are an American Hockey League affiliate of the Tampa Bay Lightning.

History 

Syracuse has had several top-level pro teams. Most notable are the Syracuse Nationals, an NBA team which played 17 seasons in Syracuse (1947–1963) before moving to Philadelphia to become the Philadelphia 76ers; and two different Major League Baseball teams: the Syracuse Stars of the National League in 1879, which didn't finish their first season; and the Syracuse Stars of the American Association in 1890.

Baseball 
Syracuse has been represented in professional baseball for all but four years since 1877, when the Syracuse Stars competed in the League Alliance, an early minor league. Syracuse fielded two major league versions of the Stars: in the  National League and the  American Association. Apart from those seasons, however, the Stars were members of high minor leagues such as the Eastern League (forerunner to the International) and the New York State League through 1917. From 1918–27, the Stars competed in the International League and were an early farm team of the St. Louis Cardinals. In 1928 the IL franchise moved to Montreal and became the Montreal Royals. The Stars moved down one classification to the New York–Penn League for 1 seasons before moving to nearby Utica.

Basketball 

Syracuse was from 1946 until 1963 home to the NBA's Syracuse Nationals, which are now the Philadelphia 76ers. They played 17 seasons in Syracuse and won the NBA championship in 1955. The NBA's 24-second clock was invented in and first came into use in Syracuse. In March 2005 the city dedicated a monument to this fact. It is a 125% scaled model of the original shot clock used.

Cycling

Football 

Syracuse had a professional football team from 1890 to 1900 known as the Syracuse Athletic Association, the independent All-Syracuse team which was known in 1921 as the Syracuse Pros in the American Professional Football Association before leaving the league and reverting to the All-Syracuse team, and briefly in the 1936 American Football League season known as the Syracuse Braves.

In 1902, the first World Series of Football was played at New York's original Madison Square Garden. The five teams in the tournament were the New York Knickerbockers, Syracuse AC, Warlow AC, the Orange (New Jersey) AC, and New York. Syracuse won the tournament 6-0 with Glenn (Pop) Warner at guard. The December 28, 1902, game where Syracuse defeated New York 5-0 at Madison Square Garden is credited as the first indoor pro football game.

The Syracuse Express were established in 1984, and were members of the Mid Continental Football League, before that league contracted into the Midwest. They joined the upstart New York Amateur Football League (NYAFL), where they became one of the league's premier teams, along with their rivals, the Buffalo Gladiators. After absorbing the Cortland Warriors, in 1999 the team became the Central New York Express, although they still played their games in suburban Syracuse. The Express won one NYAFL title in 2003. The NYAFL merged to become the Northeastern Football Alliance and with the change, the team changed and was replaced by a new team named the Syracuse Shock.

Syracuse had a team for one season in the American Indoor Football League called the Syracuse Soldiers.

Syracuse has a minor league football team, Syracuse Strong.

Ice hockey 
Syracuse has had several American Hockey League teams, which traditionally did not last longer than three seasons. The Syracuse Blazers began play in the Eastern Hockey League in 1973. The league disbanded in 1973; the team then affiliated with the North American Hockey League. 1994 marked the introduction of a new team, the Syracuse Crunch, which have been playing at the Upstate Medical University since.

Lacrosse 
The Syracuse Spirit was a member of the American Lacrosse League, a short lived professional lacrosse league in 1988, based in Syracuse, New York. The Spirit played their home games at the Griffin Field in Liverpool, New York. The general manager of the Spirit was Tom Scofield and the head coach was Jim Booth. The Spirit had a 4–1 record when the league folded.

Syracuse had a team in the National Lacrosse League (NLL) called the Syracuse Smash for three seasons from 1998 to 2000. They moved to Ottawa in 2001 and became the Ottawa Rebel.

Soccer 
The Syracuse Salty Dogs existed for two seasons (2002–2004) until folding due to financial problems. The game attendance had been among the highest in the A-League. The Syracuse Silver Knights played in the Major Arena Soccer League from 2010 before moving to Utica and becoming Utica City FC in 2018.

Venues 
Sports venues in and around Syracuse include the following:

JMA Wireless Dome 

Syracuse University's JMA Wireless Dome can hold over 33,000 and 50,000 people, for basketball and football respectively, making it the largest domed stadium in the Northeastern United States and the largest on a college campus. Especially the Orange's basketball games have been making use of the Dome's capacity over the past few years. The third most attended college sporting events are lacrosse games, with the Orange at times drawing over 6,000 fans.

NBT Bank Stadium (baseball)

Other indoor arenas 

 Tennity Ice Skating Pavilion, Syracuse University (ice hockey)

 Upstate Medical University Arena (ice hockey)

Golf courses
 Atunyote Golf Club, Turning Stone Resort
 Burnet Park Golf Course
 Drumlins Country Club (36-hole golf course)
 Green Lakes Golf Course

Ski areas and resorts
 Bristol Mountain Ski Resort, Canandaigua
 Four Seasons Golf and Ski Center, Fayetteville
 Greek Peak Mountain Resort, Cortland
 Highland Forest (county park), Fabius (cross-country)
 Labrador Mountain, Truxton
 Osceola Tug Hill Cross-Country Ski Center, Osceola
 Song Mountain Resort, Tully
 Toggenburg Mountain, Fabius

College teams

Syracuse University Orange 

Syracuse University, NCAA Division I

Men's teams
 Basketball
 Cross Country
 Football
 Lacrosse
 Rowing
 Soccer
 Track & Field

Women's teams
 Basketball
 Cross Country
 Field Hockey
 Ice Hockey
 Lacrosse
 Rowing
 Soccer
 Softball
 Tennis
 Track & Field
 Volleyball

Le Moyne College Dolphins 

Le Moyne College, NCAA Division II

Men's teams
 Baseball
 Basketball
 Cross Country
 Golf
 Lacrosse
 Soccer
 Swimming/Diving

Women's teams
 Basketball
 Cross Country
 Lacrosse
 Soccer
 Softball
 Swimming/Diving
 Tennis
 Volleyball

SUNY-ESF Mighty Oaks 

State University of New York College of Environmental Science and Forestry, USCAA

Men's teams
 Basketball
 Cross Country
 Golf
 Soccer
 Woodsman

Women's teams
 Cross Country
 Soccer
 Woodsman

Onondaga Community College Lazers 

Onondaga Community College, NCAA Division III

National championships

Baseball
 1878: Syracuse Stars: International Association (AAA Baseball) Pennant

Basketball
 1955: Syracuse Nationals: NBA World Champions
 2003: Syracuse University Orange: NCAA Division I Basketball National Champions

Field Hockey
2015: Syracuse University Orange: NCAA Division I Field Hockey National Champions - 1st Women's program at Syracuse to win a national championship

Football
 1959: Syracuse University Orange: NCAA Division I-A Football National Champions

Lacrosse
 Syracuse University Orange: NCAA Division I Lacrosse National Champions:
 1983, 1988, 1989, 1993, 1995, 2000, 2002, 2004, 2008, 2009.
 2004: Le Moyne College Dolphins: NCAA Division II Lacrosse National Champions
 2016: Le Moyne College Dolphins: NCAA Division II Lacrosse National Champions
Note: Until 2004, Syracuse University's teams were called the Orangemen and Orangewomen. Now they are known as the Orange.

See also 

 Athletics in upstate New York
 History of lacrosse
 List of ski areas and resorts in the United States
 New York State Canalway Trail
 Ski country
 Sports in New York
 Sports in New York's Capital District
 Syracuse Orange baseball

References

External links 

 
 Gersbacher, Ron. (2012). "History of Syracuse Baseball, 1858 to Present"
 Syracuse.com. "CNY Golf Course Guide: Searchable Guide of Local Golf Courses"
 Onondaga Community College Lazers